Liu Xiang or Liu Hsiang  (1 July 1890 – 20 January 1938) was one of the warlords who controlled Sichuan province during the Warlord era of 20th-century China.

Life 
Liu Xiang was born on 1 July 1890, in Dayi, Sichuan, China.  He graduated from Sichuan Military College and eventually was promoted to army commander in Sichuan. From 6 June 1921 to 24 May 1922 Liu was both Civil Governor and Military Governor of Sichuan Province, and remained civil governor until December 1922.  He again became both civil and military Governor of Sichuan Province from July 1923 until 19 February 1924 and remained military governor until 27 May 1924.  He was again military governor between 16 May 1925 until he was replaced by Deng Xihou in 1926.

During the period from 1927 to 1938, Sichuan was in the hands of five warlords: Liu Xiang, Yang Sen, Liu Wenhui, Deng Xihou, and Tian Songyao. No one warlord had enough power to take on all the others at once, so many small battles occurred, pitting one warlord against another. Large conflicts seldom developed, plotting and skirmishing characterized the Sichuanese political scene, and ephemeral coalitions and counter-coalitions emerged and vanished with equal rapidity.

However, Liu Xiang was the most influential of the Sichuan warlords. Aligning himself with Chiang Kai-Shek he became General Commanding 21st Army from 1926 to 1935.  He controlled Chongqing and its surrounding areas.  This region, sitting on the banks of the Yangtze River, was rich because of trade with provinces downriver and therefore controlled much of the economic activity in Sichuan.

From this position of strength, between 1930 and 1932 Liu and General Liu Wenhui improved their forces, organizing a small airforce at Chengdu, of two Fairchild KR-34CA aeroplanes and a Junkers K53. In 1932 Liu began putting together the "Armored Car and Tank Corps of Chungking".  Armored cars were built in Shanghai based on the GMC 1931 truck with a 37 mm gun and 2 MGs in a crude turret.

Liu had a rivalry against his uncle, General Liu Wenhui. In 1935, Liu Xiang ousted Liu Wenhui, becoming Chairman of the Government of Sichuan Province. A family-brokered peace was arranged which mollified Liu Wenhui with control of the neighbouring Xikang province, a sparsely populated but opium-rich territory on the periphery of Han China and Tibet.

At the beginning of the Second Sino-Japanese War Liu Xiang led the Sichuan 15th Army at the Battle of Shanghai and 23rd Army Group in the Battle of Nanking, and was made Commander in Chief of the River Defence Forces for the Yangtze River. In January 1938, he ordered his armies of more than 100,000 soldiers out of Sichuan to fight against the Japanese. However Liu Xiang soon died of stomach cancer on 20 January 1938, in Hankou, Hubei; some suspected he was poisoned by Chiang Kai-shek for conspiring with Shandong chairman Han Fuju to turn against Chiang.

Liu's death and the arrival of the central government in Chongqing in 1938 brought reforms that eventually put an end to the major warlord garrisons.  The Sichuan faction broke up and a lot of Sichuan units turned their loyalties over to Chiang Kai-shek and became essentially Central army units and the province a major recruiting ground for the hard pressed Nationalist armies.

Career
1921–1922 Governor of Sichuan Province
1921–1922 Military-Governor of Sichuan Province
1923–1924 Military-Governor of Sichuan Province
1923–1924 Governor of Sichuan Province
1924 Governor of Sichuan Province
1925–1926 Military-Governor of Sichuan Province
1926–1935 General Commanding 21st Army
1928–1930 General Commanding 3rd Division, 21st Army
1930–1932 General Commanding Model Division, 21st Army
1933 Commander in Chief Sichuan Province Bandit Suppression Headquarters
1935–1938 Chairman of the Government of Sichuan Province
1937 General Commanding 15th Army
1937 Commander in Chief 23rd Army Group
1937–1938 Commander in Chief River Defence Forces

See also
 History of the Republic of China
 Second Sino-Japanese War
Liangping Aerodrome
 Warlord Era

Sources
 陈贤庆(Chen Xianqing), 民国军阀派系谈 (The Republic of China warlord cliques discussed), 2007 revised edition
 Rulers; Index Li-Ll, Liu Xiang
Rulers: Chinese Administrative divisions; Sichuan
 Steen Ammentorp,  The Generals of WWII; Generals from China; Liu Xiang with photo

References

1890s births
1938 deaths
Republic of China warlords from Sichuan
History of Sichuan
Politicians from Chengdu
Burials in Chengdu